FC DAC 1904 is a Slovak football team, based in Dunajská Streda. In the 2007 to 2008 season, the team were the west group champions of the Slovak Third League. In the 2008 to 2009 season, after merging with FC Senec, the team entered the Corgoň Liga. The club is strongly supported by the Hungarian minority in Slovakia.

History

The first organized sports club in Dunajská Streda (then Dunaszerdahely, Hungary), the Dunaszerdahelyi Atlétikai Club (Dunajská Streda Athletic Club (DAC)), was founded in 1904. At the time, football was a popular sport. The club survived both world wars and continued to 1953 when the team won the Bratislava district one A grade premiership. In 1968 and 1969, the team advanced in the Western Division of the third league before returning to the regional competition. In the 1977 to 1978 season, the team again entered the third league coming sixth. In the 1978 to 1979 competition, the team came seventh. In the 1979 to 1980 season, the team won their division and was promoted to the Slovak National League (SNL 1 – second level). DAC finally promoted to Czechoslovak First League in 1984–85 season. DAC was 3rd at this league in 1987–88 season and 4th in 1990–91 and 1992–93 seasons. They finished Slovak Superliga as 3rd in 1993–94 season. But, their form was lowered after this season and relegated to second level in 1997–98 season. They immediately returned to top level but relegated again in 1999–00 season. They relegated to 3rd level in 2006–07 season. They immediately returned to 2nd level but relegated again in 2008–09 season. They made successively two promotions and returned to top level in 2013. Since 2013, DAC has been affiliated with ŠK Senec. In 1987, DAC were the Slovak Cup (Slovenský Pohár) and Czechoslovak Cup (Československý Pohár) winners.

Previous names
 1908: DSE (Dunaszerdahelyi Sport Egylet)
 1920: DAC (Dunaszerdahelyi Atlétikai Club)
 1933: DTC (Dunaszerdahelyi Torna Club)
 1942: DLE (Dunaszerdahelyi Labdarúgó Egyesület)
 1948: Sokol
 1953: Slavoj
 1965: Jednota
 1974: DAC
 1993: FC DAC
 1994: Marat – DAC
 1994: 1.FC DAC – Gemer
 1996: 1.FC DAC
 2000: FK DAC 1904
 2014: FC DAC 1904

1980s
In the 1980–81 season, the team came eleventh. In the 1981–82 season, 26,089 attended games. The team won 15 games, lost 11 games and drew in 4 games. In the 1982–83 season, the team's star player Juraj Szikora could not participate in the competition. The team came second, four points behind the premier team, Banská Bystrica. In the 1983–84 season, the team came second, four points behind Petržalka. 8,136 patrons attended a home game where the team beat Petržalka three points to zero.  scored twenty-two points becoming the highest goal scorer of the League for that season. In the 1984–85 season, Karol Pecze coached the team. 10,000 patrons attended the last home gain against Nitra. Ladislav Tóth again scored twenty-two points and won the golden shoe. In the 1985–86 season, the team made its debut in the Czechoslovak First League. The team reaches the quarter-finals and comes eleventh. In the 1986–87 season, the team came fourth in the Slovak League. They won both the Slovak and the Czechoslovak cups. In the 1987 to 1988 season, the team entered the European Cup. In the preliminary round, DAC had two wins against AEL Limassol (Cyprus),1–0 and 5–1. The team's campaign ended in the first round with a defeat to Young Boys Bern (2–1 and 1–3). In the Slovak national league, the team came third. In the 1988–89 season, the team had a 6–0 victory over Östers of Sweden in the first round of the UEFA Cup. In the second round, the team played Bayern Munich. 15,572 patrons attended that game. The team came sixth in the Slovak league. In the 1989–90 season, Anton Dragúň led the team to fourteenth place.

1990s
In the 1990–91 season, Juraj Szikora coached the team and they came fourth. In the 1991–92 season, the team won the Intertoto Cup in group eight. After twelve days, Szikora was replaced by Vladimír Hrivnák. The team came ninth. In the 1992–93 season, the last year of the Slovak national league, the team was coached by Dušan Radolský. In the 1993–94 season, the first year of the Slovak League, the team, coached by Ladislav Škorpil scores 62 times and comes third. Pavol Diňa is the top scorer with 19 goals. In the UEFA Cup, DAC played Casino Salzburg who defeat them twice with a score zero to two in the first round. In the 1994–95 season, with coach Jozef Valovič, the team comes fourth. In the 1995–96 season, four coaches: Jozef Valovič, Anton Grajcár, Juraj Szikora, and Jozef Adamec, led the team to tenth place from a field of twelve. In the 1996–97 season, the team, coached by Jozef Adamec came fourteenth out of sixteen. In the 1997–98 season, after thirteen years, DAC fell from the Slovak League. Ladislav Škorpil and Dušan Liba coached the team which won five games of thirty and came last out of sixteen teams. In the 1998–99 season, Vladimír Rusnák coached the team and they won the second league. In the 1990–00 season, the first league was reorganized. DAC cam fourteenth in the first league and was relegated to the second league again. The coaches in this season were Viliam Ilko, Anton Grajcár, and Ladislav Kuna.

2000s
In the 2000–01 season, DAC was coached by Ladislav Kuna and came fifth in the second league. In 2001–02, the coach, Ladislav Hudec, was replaced after nine rounds by Juraj Szikora. The team came ninth in the second league. In the 2002–03 season, Tibor Szaban coached the team. After half the rounds, the team was three points from dropping to a lower league. Szaban was then replaced by Milan Albrecht. DAC won the next ten games and came eighth. In 2003–04, Juraj Szikora and Dušan Liba were the coaches. The team won nine of fifteen games. At this point, the team was engaged by Iranian sponsors. Robert Pflug became the coach and the team won thirty points. The 2004–05 season begins with Štefan Horný. After fifteen rounds he is replaced by Peter Fieber who was once a player in the team. DAC came eighth. The best game was against Slovan in front of 2,890 fans where DAC won two points to zero. In 2005–06, the Slovak League was again reorganized and DAC dropped from the second league. A series of five coaches (Ladislav Kuna, Peter Fieber, Anton Grajcár, Štefan Zaťko, and Tibor Mičinec) allowed the team twelfth place in their competition. In the 2006–07 season, the first Slovak League was renamed the Corgoň Liga and the second league became the first league in which DAC played the season. Milan Albrecht coaches for rounds one to six and then is replaced by Robert Pflug. In 2007–08, DAC won the second league competition (2. liga) but this was not a nationwide competition. The coaches were Tibor Meszlényi, Peter Fieber and assistant Július Šimon.

Supporters and Rivalries

DAC supporters are called YBS (Yellow Blue Supporters), biggest rivals are Slovan Bratislava and Spartak Trnava.  DAC supporters maintain friendly relations with fans of the Hungarian Ferencváros Budapest. The YBS usually display a banner stating “Dunaszerdahely”, the Hungarian name of Dunajská Streda, in the home end and chant in Hungarian, including the Hungarian anthem Himnusz or the popular song Nélküled, which is usually sung by performers before kick off. The Hungarian Tricolour is also usually displayed on the stands of MOL Aréna by the fans.

The preferred use of the Hungarian language from fans and club officials, however, has caused debate in the Slovak society.
Slovak National Party MP and former football international Dušan Tittel had stated in a Parliament session: "Going to Dunajská Streda to watch a football game when 9,000 sing the Hungarian anthem, I don't think you'd like it", promoting a bill to make an offense the singing of foreign national anthems. DAC President Oszkár Világi and the club's spokesmen Krisztián Nagy had declared that the club will continue to support the fans and such customs, even in defiance of fines.

Affiliated club
The following club is affiliated with DAC:

  ŠTK 1914 Šamorín (2019–)

Honours

Domestic
 Czechoslovakia
 Czechoslovak First League (1925–93)
  Third place (1): 1987–88
 Czechoslovak Cup (1961–93)
  Winners (1): 1987
 1.SNL (1st Slovak National League) (1969–93)
  Winners (1): 1984–85

 Slovakia
 Slovak Super Liga (1993–)
  Runners-up (2): 2018–19, 2020–21
  Third place (3): 1993–94, 2017–18, 2019–20
 Slovak Cup (1961–)
  Winners (1): 1987
  Runners-up (2): 1992–93, 1994–95
 Slovak Second Division (1993–)
  Winners (2): 1998–99, 2012–13

Slovak League Top Goalscorer
Slovak League Top scorer since 1993–94

1Shared award

UEFA ranking
This is the current 2022–23 (July 31) UEFA coefficient:

Full list

Transfers
DAC have produced numerous players who have gone on to represent the Slovak national football team. Over the last periods there has been a steady increase of young players leaving Dunajská Streda after a few years of first team football and moving on to play football in leagues of a higher standard, with the German Bundesliga (András Schäfer to Union Berlin in 2022), Czech First League (Tibor Jančula to Žižkov in 1993, Léonard Kweuke to Sparta in 2010, Dzon Delarge to Liberec in 2012, Erik Pačinda to Plzeň in 2019), Danish Superliga (Pavol Šafranko to Aalborg in 2017, Marko Divković to Brøndby IF in 2022), Austrian Bundesliga (Ján Novota to Rapid Wien in 2011), Polish Ekstraklasa (Tomáš Huk (2019) and Kristopher Vida (2020) to Piast Gliwice, Ľubomír Šatka to Lech Poznań in 2019), American Major League Soccer (Matej Oravec to Philadelphia Union in 2020), Scottish Premiership
(Vakoun Issouf Bayo to Celtic F.C. in 2019). The top transfer was agreed in 2019 when Ivorian forward Vakoun Issouf Bayo joined Scottish Celtic F.C. for a fee of €2.2 million.

Record departures

Record arrivals

*-unofficial fee

Sponsorship

Club partners
source
Kukkonia
MOL
ENARGO
St. Nicolaus
Tatra Billing
OTP Bank
FCC Environment
SAM
Strabag

Results

League and Cup history
Slovak League only (1993–present)
{|class="wikitable"
! style="color:#00308F; background:#FFBF00;"| Season
! style="color:#00308F; background:#FFBF00;"| Division (Name)
! style="color:#00308F; background:#FFBF00;"| Pos./Teams
! style="color:#00308F; background:#FFBF00;"| Pl.
! style="color:#00308F; background:#FFBF00;"| W
! style="color:#00308F; background:#FFBF00;"| D
! style="color:#00308F; background:#FFBF00;"| L
! style="color:#00308F; background:#FFBF00;"| GS
! style="color:#00308F; background:#FFBF00;"| GA
! style="color:#00308F; background:#FFBF00;"| P
! style="color:#00308F; background:#FFBF00;"|Slovak Cup
! style="color:#00308F; background:#FFBF00;" colspan=2|Europe
! style="color:#00308F; background:#FFBF00;"|Top Scorer (Goals)
|-
|align=center|1993–94
|align=center|1st (Mars Superliga)
|align=center bgcolor=tan|3/(12)
|align=center|32
|align=center|13
|align=center|10
|align=center|9
|align=center|62
|align=center|47
|align=center|36
|align=center|Semi-finals
|align=center|UC
|align=left|1.R ( Casino Salzburg)
|align=center| Pavol Diňa (19)
|-
|align=center|1994–95
|align=center|1st (Mars Superliga)
|align=center|4/(12)
|align=center|32
|align=center|13
|align=center|7
|align=center|12
|align=center|41
|align=center|42
|align=center|46
|align=center bgcolor=silver|Runners-up
|align=center|
|align=center|
|align=center|  Jozef Ürge (4)   Vladimír Weiss (4)   Tibor Zsákovics (4)   Zsolt Kianek (4)
|-
|-
|align=center|1995–96
|align=center|1st (Mars Superliga)
|align=center|10/(12) 
|align=center|32
|align=center|10
|align=center|3
|align=center|19
|align=center|41
|align=center|76
|align=center|33
|align=center|2nd round
|align=center|
|align=center|
|align=center| Eugen Bari (8)
|-
|align=center|1996–97
|align=center|1st (Mars Superliga)
|align=center|14/(16)
|align=center|30
|align=center|9
|align=center|7
|align=center|14
|align=center|29
|align=center|45
|align=center|34
|align=center|Quarter-finals
|align=center|
|align=center|
|align=center| Milan Rimanovský (9)
|-
|align=center|1997–98
|align=center|1st (Mars Superliga)
|align=center bgcolor=red|16/(16)
|align=center|30
|align=center|5
|align=center|6
|align=center|19
|align=center|26
|align=center|51
|align=center|21
|align=center|1st round
|align=center|
|align=center| 
|align=center|  Jaroslav Mašek (4)
|-
|align=center|1998–99
|align=center|2nd (1. Liga)
|align=center bgcolor=green|1/(16)
|align=center|34
|align=center|21
|align=center|6
|align=center|7
|align=center|62
|align=center|29
|align=center|69
|align=center|2nd round
|align=center|
|align=center|
|align=center|  Mikuláš Radványi (20)
|-
|align=center|1999–00
|align=center|1st (Mars Superliga)
|align=center bgcolor=red|14/(16)
|align=center|30
|align=center|6
|align=center|9
|align=center|15
|align=center|24
|align=center|42
|align=center|27
|align=center|Quarter-finals
|align=center| 
|align=center|
|align=center|  Mikuláš Radványi (6)   Július Šimon (6)
|-
|align=center|2000–01
|align=center|2nd (1. Liga)
|align=center|5/(18)
|align=center|34
|align=center|16
|align=center|7
|align=center|11
|align=center|43
|align=center|41
|align=center|55
|align=center|1st round
|align=center|
|align=center|
|align=center|  Ladislav Suchánek (14) 
|-
|align=center|2001–02
|align=center|2nd (1. Liga)
|align=center|8/(16)
|align=center|30
|align=center|11
|align=center|10
|align=center|9
|align=center|42
|align=center|38
|align=center|43
|align=center|1st round
|align=center|
|align=center|
|align=center|  Vladimír Veselý (7) 
|-
|align=center|2002–03
|align=center|2nd (1. Liga)
|align=center|8/(16)
|align=center|30
|align=center|11
|align=center|8
|align=center|11
|align=center|39
|align=center|40
|align=center|41
|align=center|1st round
|align=center|
|align=center|
|align=center| Miroslav Kozák (9)
|-
|align=center|2003–04
|align=center|2nd (1. Liga)
|align=center|11/(16)
|align=center|30
|align=center|11
|align=center|6
|align=center|13
|align=center|36
|align=center|44
|align=center|39
|align=center|1st round
|align=center|
|align=center|
|align=center| Peter Bognár (9)
|-
|align=center|2004–05
|align=center|2nd (1. Liga)
|align=center|6/(16)
|align=center|30
|align=center|12
|align=center|6
|align=center|12
|align=center|33
|align=center|45
|align=center|42
|align=center|1st round
|align=center|
|align=center|
|align=center|  Peter Bognár (5)
|-
|align=center|2005–06
|align=center|2nd (1. Liga)
|align=center|12/(16)
|align=center|30
|align=center|7
|align=center|6
|align=center|17
|align=center|27
|align=center|51
|align=center|27
|align=center|1st round
|align=center|
|align=center|
|align=center|  Lukáš Rohovský (4)
|-
|align=center|2006–07
|align=center|2nd (1. Liga)
|align=center bgcolor=red|9/(12)
|align=center|36
|align=center|9
|align=center|12
|align=center|15
|align=center|32
|align=center|46
|align=center|39
|align=center|1st round
|align=center|
|align=center|
|align=center|  Siradji Sani (6)
|-
|align=center|2007–08
|align=center|3rd (2.Liga)
|align=center bgcolor=green|1/(16)
|align=center|30
|align=center|18
|align=center|3
|align=center|8
|align=center|54
|align=center|29
|align=center|57
|align=center|3rd round
|align=center|
|align=center|
|align=center|  Ladislav Belkovics (11)
|-
|align=center|2008–09
|align=center|1st (Corgoň Liga)
|align=center|9/(12)
|align=center|33
|align=center|9
|align=center|9
|align=center|15
|align=center|32
|align=center|59
|align=center|36
|align=center|Quarter-finals
|align=center|
|align=center| 
|align=center|  Leonard Kweuke (11)
|-
|align=center|2009–10
|align=center|1st (Corgoň Liga)
|align=center|10/(12)
|align=center|33
|align=center|7
|align=center|12
|align=center|14
|align=center|28
|align=center|47
|align=center|33
|align=center|Semi-finals
|align=center|
|align=center|
|align=center|  Samuel Koejoe (7)
|-
|align=center|2010–11
|align=center|1st (Corgoň Liga)
|align=center|9/(12)
|align=center|33
|align=center|9
|align=center|9
|align=center|15
|align=center|24
|align=center|39
|align=center|36
|align=center|2nd round
|align=center|
|align=center|
|align=center|  Zoltán Harsányi (4)
|-
|align=center|2011–12
|align=center|1st (Corgoň Liga)
|align=center bgcolor=red|12/(12)
|align=center|33
|align=center|5
|align=center|1
|align=center|27
|align=center|21
|align=center|63
|align=center|16
|align=center|2nd round
|align=center| 
|align=center|
|align=center|  John Delarge (8)
|-
|align=center|2012–13
|align=center|2nd (2. Liga)
|align=center bgcolor=green|1/(12)
|align=center|33
|align=center|19
|align=center|8
|align=center|6
|align=center|41
|align=center|26
|align=center|65
|align=center|2nd round
|align=center|
|align=center|
|align=center|  Stanislav Velický (8) 
|-
|align=center|2013–14
|align=center|1st (Corgoň Liga)
|align=center|11/(12)
|align=center|33
|align=center|8
|align=center|8
|align=center|17
|align=center|29
|align=center|57
|align=center|261
|align=center|3rd round
|align=center|
|align=center|
|align=center|  Ákos Szarka (4)
|-
|align=center|2014–15
|align=center|1st (Fortuna Liga)
|align=center|8/(12)
|align=center|33
|align=center|9
|align=center|12
|align=center|12
|align=center|32
|align=center|44
|align=center|39
|align=center|Semi-finals
|align=center|
|align=center|
|align=center|  Ákos Szarka (5)
|-
|align=center|2015–16
|align=center|1st (Fortuna Liga)
|align=center|7/(12)
|align=center|33
|align=center|12
|align=center|7
|align=center|14
|align=center|38
|align=center|42
|align=center|43
|align=center|Quarter-finals
|align=center| 
|align=center|
|align=center|  Erik Pačinda (10)
|-
|align=center|2016–17
|align=center|1st (Fortuna Liga)
|align=center|7/(12)
|align=center|30
|align=center|10
|align=center|12
|align=center|8
|align=center|37
|align=center|34
|align=center|42
|align=center|Quarter-finals
|align=center| 
|align=center|
|align=center|  Erik Pačinda (8)
|-
|align=center|2017–18
|align=center|1st (Fortuna Liga)
|align=center bgcolor=tan|3/(12)
|align=center|32
|align=center|16
|align=center|9
|align=center|7
|align=center|46
|align=center|32
|align=center|57
|align=center|Quarter-finals
|align=center| 
|align=center|
|align=center|  Erik Pačinda (10)
|-
|align=center|2018–19
|align=center|1st (Fortuna Liga)
|align=center bgcolor=silver|2/(12)
|align=center|32
|align=center|19
|align=center|6
|align=center|7
|align=center|63
|align=center|37
|align=center|63
|align=center|1/8 finals
|align=center|EL
|align=left|2.QR ( Dinamo Minsk)
|align=center|  Kristopher Vida (11)
|-
|align=center|2019–20
|align=center|1st (Fortuna Liga)
|align=center bgcolor=tan|3/(12)
|align=center|27
|align=center|15
|align=center|5
|align=center|7
|align=center|42
|align=center|28
|align=center|50
|align=center|Semi-Finals
|align=center|EL
|align=left|2.QR ( Atromitos)
|align=center| Zsolt Kalmár (9)
|-
|align=center|2020–21
|align=center|1st (Fortuna Liga)
|align=center bgcolor=silver|2/(12)
|align=center|32
|align=center|19
|align=center|8
|align=center|5
|align=center|66
|align=center|38
|align=center|65
|align=center|Quarter-finals
|align=center|EL
|align=left|3.QR ( LASK)
|align=center| Eric Ramírez (16)
|-
|align=center|2021–22
|align=center|1st (Fortuna Liga)
|align=center|4/(12)
|align=center|32
|align=center|12
|align=center|10
|align=center|10
|align=center|39
|align=center|37
|align=center|46
|align=center|3rd Round
|align=center|ECL
|align=left|2.QR ( FK Partizan)
|align=center| Nikola Krstović (7)
|}
1 Deducted six points at the end of the season due to match-fixing.

European competition history

UEFA-administered

Not UEFA-administered

Current squad

For recent transfers, see List of Slovak football transfers winter 2022-23

Retired numbers

12 – The 12th man (reserved for the club supporters)

Out on loan

Staff

Technical staff
Source:

|}

Management

|}

Player records

Most goals

Players whose name is listed in bold are still active.

Notable players
Had international caps for their respective countries. Players whose name is listed in bold represented their countries while playing for DAC.

Past (and present) players who are the subjects of Wikipedia articles can be found here.

Former head coaches

  Vojtech Gödölle (1977–78)
  Vladimír Hrivnák (1978–81)
  Štefan Jačiansky (1981)
  Anton Richtárik (1982)
  Juraj Szikora (1982–84)
  Karol Pecze (1984–89)
  Anton Dragúň (1989–90)
  Juraj Szikora (1990–91)
  Vladimír Hrivnák (1991–92)
  Dusan Radolsky (1 Jul 1992 – 30 Jun 1993)
  Ladislav Škorpil (1993–94)
  Jozef Valovič (1994–95)
  Anton Grajcár (caretaker) (1995)
  Juraj Szikora (1995–96)
  Jozef Adamec (1996–97)
  Ladislav Škorpil (1997–98)
  Dušan Liba (1998)
  Vladimír Rusnák (1998–99)
  Viliam Ilko (1999)
  Anton Grajcár (caretaker) (1999)
  Ladislav Kuna (1999 – 30 Nov 2000)
  Ladislav Hudec (2001)
  Juraj Szikora (2001–02)
  Tibor Szaban (2002)
  Milan Albrecht (2003)
  Juraj Szikora (2003)
  Dušan Liba (2003)
  Robert Pflug (1 Jan 2004 – 31 May 2004)
  Stefan Horny (2004–05)
  Ladislav Kuna (2005)
  Peter Fieber (2005)
  Štefan Zaťko (2005–06)
  Tibor Mičinec (2006)
  Milan Albrecht (2006)
  Robert Pflug (2006–07)
  Asghar Sharafi (1 Jul 2007 – 12 May 2008)
  Peter Fieber (2008)
  Milan Đuričić (1 Jul 2008 – 17 Aug 2008)
  Michal Kuruc (14 Aug 2008 – 24 Aug 2008) (car)
  Werner Lorant (29 Aug 2008 – 22 Apr 2009)
  Zlatko Kranjčar (22 Apr 2009 – 30 Jun 2009)
  Kurt Garger (4 Jul 2009 – 10 May 2010)
  Mikuláš Radványi (10 May 2010 – 30 Jun 2011)
  Štefan Horný (1 Jul 2011 – 6 Aug 2011)
  Krisztián Németh (8 Aug 2011 – 25 Mar 2012)
  Werner Lorant (26 Mar 2012 – 7 Apr 2012)
  Mikuláš Radványi (1 Jun 2012 – 17 Jan 2015)
  Tomislav Marić (17 Jan 2015 – 30 Jun 2016)
 Krisztián Németh (23 May 2016 – 20 Oct 2016)
  Csaba László (20 Oct 2016 – 6 Jun 2017)
  Marco Rossi (11 Jun 2017 – 20 Jun 2018)
  Peter Hyballa (16 Jul 2018 – 3 Jan 2020)
  Hélder (5 Jan 2020 – 31 May 2020)
  Bernd Storck (1 Jun 2020 – 21 Apr 2021)
  Antal Németh (22 Apr 2021 – 10 Nov 2021)
  João Janeiro (11 Nov 2021 – 31 May 2022)
  Adrián Guľa (15 June 2022-)

References

External links
 Official website 
 

 
Dunajská Streda
Football clubs in Slovakia
Association football clubs established in 1904
Czechoslovak First League clubs
1904 establishments in Slovakia